André Filipe Russo Franco (born 12 April 1998) is a Portuguese professional footballer who plays as an attacking midfielder for FC Porto.

Club career

Estoril
Born in Lisbon, Franco spent almost all of his youth career with local Sporting CP, with one year on loan to neighbouring C.F. Os Belenenses. In 2018 he signed with G.D. Estoril Praia, being assigned to the under-23 team.

Franco made his competitive debut with the main squad on 3 August 2019, coming on as a 69th-minute substitute in a 1–1 away draw against F.C. Paços de Ferreira in the second round of the Taça da Liga (penalty shootout loss). He played his first match in the LigaPro 15 days later, again from the bench, in the 1–2 home loss to S.C. Farense.

In the 2020–21 season, Franco scored once in 20 games to help the club return to the Primeira Liga as champions. He made his debut in the competition on 7 August 2021, starting and netting in the 2–0 win at F.C. Arouca. He scored a further ten goals during the campaign, as his team easily avoided relegation; one came in a 2–2 home draw with B-SAD on 24 April in which he, two teammates and as many opponents were sent off in a confrontation at the end.

Porto
On 4 August 2022, Franco joined FC Porto on a five-year contract, for €4 million. He debuted 24 days later in a 3–1 loss at Rio Ave F.C. as a late replacement for Iván Marcano, and on 10 September he scored his first goal, coming off the bench to conclude a 3–0 home victory over G.D. Chaves with a close-range deflection.

Honours
Estoril
Liga Portugal 2: 2020–21

Porto
Taça da Liga: 2022–23

References

External links

1998 births
Living people
Portuguese footballers
Footballers from Lisbon
Association football midfielders
Primeira Liga players
Liga Portugal 2 players
Sporting CP footballers
G.D. Estoril Praia players
FC Porto players